Cooper Boone (born September 11, 1963) is an American country music artist, psychologist and chef.

Early years 
Boone was born Michael John Schroeder in Wells, Minnesota, and raised in St. Joseph, Minnesota, where he sang in church choirs and learned to play trumpet and piano. He holds two master's degrees and a doctoral degree in clinical psychology.

Career

Psychology
Boone moved to New York City in 1994, where he started a clinical psychology practice, working on issues including drug addiction, 9/11 survivors, couples counseling, career problems and stress management. In 2010, he submitted an application to ABC's "Dear GMA Advice Guru" contest, as a part of Good Morning America'''s search for an on-air advice guru. Of 15,000 applicants, he was named one of four finalists and was featured giving advice on an episode of Good Morning America on January 24, 2011.

Music
In 2005, Boone began writing country pop songs and recorded his debut album, Dance in the Wind, which was released the following year. After an EP in 2008, which was produced by Anthony Krizan (former Spin Doctors lead guitarist), Boone's second full-length album, which was self-titled, was released in August 2009. Its first single, "Cougar Dream," is a lighthearted ode to attractive middle-aged women. Other tracks on the album take a more serious tone, inspired by stories told to him by some of his patients, particularly those who were affected by the September 11 attacks.

Boone was named Best Country Artist at the 2008 Hollywood Music Awards; won Musikfest's 2008 Battle of the Bands showcase, earning a spot at the 10-day music festival held annually in Bethlehem, Pennsylvania; won a 2010 Independent Music Award for Country Vox Pop; won a 2009 Independent Singer-Songwriter Award for Country Song for "Mending Fences"; and has been nominated for Hollywood Music in Media Awards and Los Angeles Music Awards. He performed "Mending Fences" live on ABC News Now in 2009, and co-wrote "One Song," the theme song for DKMS Americas, which he performed at a 2009 DKMS fundraiser with the PS22 Chorus. Starting in 1997, he performed at the Country Living Fairs in Atlanta, Columbus, Austin and Rhinebeck, New York. He has opened for headliners including Trace Adkins, Craig Morgan, The Bacon Brothers and Bob Guiney, and performed at the 1996 Miss America's Outstanding Teen pageant as a featured soloist. His song "Made in America" was the theme song for the Travel Channel's Made in America, hosted by John Ratzenberger, which ran from 2004 to 2008. He has performed for Paula Deen live as well as on the Paula Deen Network several times."Weekend Bonus: Crooning With Cooper,"  pauladeen.com, October 17, 2014.

Cooking
Boone has been a featured guest chef on various television programs and hosts a website, Cooper's Table, where he shares his recipes and happenings on his farm.

He interviewed Paula Deen, Trisha Yearwood, Tyler Florence and others for Country Living magazine at the 2011 New York City Wine and Food Festival, and is host of the Country Living Blue Ribbon Blogger Awards."Cooper Boone & Amber Hayes," bethelwoodscenter.org, July 26, 2011.

Personal life
Boone and his partner, Mark Veeder, have been together since 2001. They reside on their farm in North East, Pennsylvania, with their twin daughters and their chickens.

Discography

Albums
 Dance in the Wind (2006)
 Cooper Boone (2009)

Extended plays
 Made in America'' (2008)

Awards

References

External links
 Official website
 Cooper's Table

Living people
American country singer-songwriters
American male singer-songwriters
21st-century American psychologists
1963 births
People from Wells, Minnesota
People from St. Joseph, Minnesota
Singer-songwriters from Minnesota
20th-century American psychologists